Cosmopterix tetrophthalma is a moth in the  family Cosmopterigidae. It is found in South Africa.

References

Natural History Museum Lepidoptera generic names catalog

Endemic moths of South Africa
tetrophthalma